Lai Meiyun (Chinese: 赖美云; born 7 July 1998), is a Chinese Singer signed under Qigu Culture. She was a member of Rocket Girls 101 after ranking 6th in the survival show Produce 101. She was also a member of S.I.N.G as the main vocal and center under Qigu Culture.

Early life and education 
Lai Meiyun was born in a single parent family in Shenzhen, Guangdong, and was raised by her mother.

Meiyun has studied in Shenzhen High School from 2013 to 2016. During this period, Meiyun joined the Lily Choir of Shenzhen Senior High School with 1st place, where she laid the foundation for becoming a singer in days to come.

Meiyun has participated the audition of Chinese girl idol group SNH48 for 3 times but didn't make the cut.

Career

Pre-debut: SING Idol Group Competition 
In October 2014, Meiyun auditioned for a position in S.I.N.G and was accepted as a trainee after ranking in the top 10. On December 13, Meiyun began a half-year professional training course on physique, vocal and dance with the group.

2015-2017: Debut and Promotion of Songs 

On August 10, 2015, Meiyun debuted as part of S.I.N.G with the single "青春的告白". On August 10, 2015, Lai Meiyun released the first single "The Confessions of Youth" with the combination, and officially debuted; on November 11, 2015, the third single "Bulu Bulu" was released with the combination; On December 16, 2015, Meiyun released the Christmas-themed single "灵儿想叮当 Linger wants to be a jingle" and song MV with S.I.N.G.

On January 9, 2016, she participated in the first annual Star Awards Ceremony(繁星年度颁奖盛典) with the group and won the annual Pioneer Newcomer Award. On March 28, 2016, she won The hottest ring tone of second Cool music Asian Festival Cool Music Popularity List. On June 17, 2016, she released the graduation season single "繁星 Stars" with the group. On July, 2016, She released the first digital music album "致青春" with the group. This album includes a total of 8 singles including "青春的告白" and "偷偷喜欢你". In the same year, Meiyun also released several new singles with the group.

2018-2020: Produce 101 and Rocket Girls 101 

Meiyun participated in Produce 101 as a trainee, representing Qigu Culture. She then emerged 6th in the final rankings and debuted with members from other companies to form Rocket Girls 101 on June 23, 2018. On July 24, with the Rocket Girl 101 released the song "卡路里"("Calories") for the film "Hello Mr. Billionaire" ; On August 18, with the Rocket Girl 101 released the first EP "Bump" ; On December 31, with the Rocket Girl 101 to participate in the Hunan Television New Year's concert.

On January 12, 2019, with the Rocket Girl 101 held "2019 Rocket Girl 101 Flying Concert" in Shanghai; On July 12, released the first individual Single "It's Raining"("下雨了"), which is included in the Rocket Girl 101 newly released album "立风”. On November 22, released her second Single "Not Tiny"("不渺小"), which is an award for her 2nd sales contribution to Rocket Girl 101's second album "立风”.

On June 23, 2020, Meiyun graduated from Rocket Girls 101.

2020-Present: Solo Career 
On June 24, 2020, just after graduation from Rocket Girls 101, Meiyun's personal studio was founded and released her first Single as a solo artist, "Girls and Crown"("女孩与王冠“), Meiyun begins her solo career. On July 28, released her single"Wait"("等等") as the theme song of TV show Forget Me Not Café(忘不了餐厅) series 2. On July 31, released "Every Time"("每一次") as the theme song of animated series "Fox Spirit Matchmaker"("狐妖小红娘·金晨曦篇"). On August 3, released "Wild Girl"("野生姑娘”) as the theme song of "Psychic Princess"("通灵妃“) series 2.

Discography

Promotional singles

Filmography

Television Dramas

Television shows

Films

See also 
 Super Impassioned Net Generation

References

External links 
 

1998 births
Living people
People from Shenzhen
Korean-language singers of China
Rocket Girls 101 members
Produce 101 (Chinese TV series) contestants
Singers from Guangdong